Sabat is a surname. Notable people with the surname include:
Martín Carrera Sabat (1806–1871), Mexican general and interim president
Christopher Sabat (born 1973), American voice actor 
Hermenegildo Sábat (born 1933), Uruguayan-Argentine caricaturist
Marc Sabat (born 1965), Canadian composer
Ramon and Julia Sabat, owners of Panart Records
Ali Hussain Sibat, Lebanese TV host
Kuntala Kumari Sabat An Oriya Poetess from India

Catalan-language surnames